Haplochromis ishmaeli is a species of cichlid endemic to Lake Victoria though it may now be extinct in the wild.  This species can reach a length of  SL. A captive "insurance population" is maintained.

The specific name honours George Ishmael, who was an interpreter at the Police Court in Entebbe, who gave valuable assistance to the Swiss ornithologist Edward Degen while he was in Uganda.

References

ishmaeli
Fish described in 1906
Taxonomy articles created by Polbot